Lloyd Weldon "Butch" Keaser (born February 9, 1950) is an American former wrestler who competed in the 1976 Summer Olympics, for the United States.

Keaser was born in Pumphrey, Maryland. He wrestled for the United States Naval Academy and was a two-time NCAA All American. He was an alternate on the 1972 Olympic team to Dan Gable. In 1973, he won a gold medal at the world championships in freestyle wrestling and became the first African-American to achieve this honor. In 1976, he won the silver medal at the Montreal Olympics. Keaser is now the wrestling  coach at Wilde Lake High School in Columbia, Maryland.

In 1996, Keaser was inducted into the National Wrestling Hall of Fame as a Distinguished Member.

Bibliography
 Moffat, James V. 2007. Wrestlers At The Trials. Exit Zero Publishing. 
 Hammond, Jairus K. & Little, Lisa. 2008. The African American Wrestling Experience. National Wrestling Hall of Fame and Museum
 Moore, Roger. 2009. Glory Beyond the Sport: Wrestling and the Military. National Wrestling Hall of Fame and Museum

References

External links
 
 

1950 births
Living people
Wrestlers at the 1976 Summer Olympics
American male sport wrestlers
Olympic silver medalists for the United States in wrestling
People from Anne Arundel County, Maryland
People from Columbia, Maryland
World Wrestling Championships medalists
Medalists at the 1976 Summer Olympics
Pan American Games gold medalists for the United States
Pan American Games medalists in wrestling
Wrestlers at the 1975 Pan American Games
Medalists at the 1975 Pan American Games
20th-century American people
21st-century American people